The Fizfak (Faculty of Physics) of Moscow State University is one of the most esteemed faculties of Moscow State University, widely regarded by students as one of the toughest faculties in the university. It was established in 1933. The current dean of the faculty - Nikolay Sysoev.

Departments of the faculty
Department of experimental and theoretical physics
Department of the physics of solid bodies
Department of radiophysics and electronics
Department of nuclear physics
Department of geophysics
Department of astronomy
Department of additional educating programs

Notable alumni

Nobel winners
Igor Tamm (Nobel Prize in Physics, 1958)
Ilya Frank (Nobel Prize in Physics, 1958)
Lev Davidovich Landau (Nobel Prize in Physics, 1962)
Andrei Sakharov (Nobel Peace Prize, 1975)
Vitaly Ginzburg (Nobel Prize in Physics, 2003)
Alexei Alexeyevich Abrikosov (Nobel Prize in Physics, 2003)

Physicists
Sergei Kurdyumov
Stanislav Mikheyev
Dmitry Shirkov
Alexei Smirnov
Igor Ternov
Sergei Tyablikov
Sergey Vavilov
Anatoly Vlasov
Georgiy Zatsepin
Dmitry Zubarev
Roald Sagdeev
Andrei Linde
Alexei Starobinsky
Rem Khokhlov
Oleg Leonidovich Kuznetsov

Educationists
Georgy Shchedrovitsky

Businessmen
Oleg Deripaska
Yuri Milner

Artists
Natalia Sokol

External links
Official site 

Physics, Faculty of
Education in Moscow
Physics institutes